Crazy Itch Radio is the fourth studio album by English electronic music duo Basement Jaxx.  The album features Linda Lewis and Swedish popstar Robyn among the guest vocalists.

The album was listed on several publications' year-end lists, including The Observer and PopMatters.

Background
"The Crazy Itch of life is the thing that inspires and motivates you to act," explains Felix Buxton about the title of the album.

The duo ended up making about 40 songs for the album. "And then towards of the process of the album, we're like 'Okay, we got to focus on some now and get them finished.'"

The duo incorporated Balkan horns on the album.

It was originally scheduled for an early 2006 release but the release date was put back.

"Hush Boy" and "Take Me Back to Your House" were released as singles. "Hey U" was released as a single to digital download services in March 2007.

For the song "Hush Boy", the band worked with vocalist Vula Malinga to create its melody over a basic track. Vula's vocal was then kept but all the music was redone, which the band said allowed them "a tremendous amount of freedom to explore different sounds".

Critical reception 

The album was given a score of 73 out of 100 by Metacritic based on "generally favorable reviews", although less so than Basement Jaxx's previous records. AllMusic gave it 4 out of 5 stars, writing "at this point, it's impossible to imagine them topping themselves; an album that is merely deeply engaging and wildly entertaining cannot be considered a flop in any way." In his Consumer Guide, Robert Christgau gave the album a two-star honorable mention, stating, "Interchangeable ladies detail interchangeable ups and downs over beats whose changeabilty supposedly renders them indelible," and picked out two songs from the album, "Take Me Back to Your House" and "Run 4 Cover".

Pitchfork, while still giving the album a positive review, wrote, "Crazy Itch Radio isn't a bad album by any means; it just doesn't scream "best album of the year" from the moment you put it on." NME, on the other hand, was more critical, writing "It's easy enough to ignore until a real stinker passes by."

Resident Advisor More successful was Basement Jaxx's 'Crazy Itch Radio'. Unlike 'Kish Kash' from 2003, a rather ho-hum effort handicapped by letting N’Sync's JC Chasez near the mic, this year's 'Crazy Itch Radio' was easily the duo's best, mostly due to an inspired roster of vocalists: R&B songstress Vula Malinga, Swedish superstar Robyn, and second lady of grime Lady Marga. The production was also as diverse as ever, expertly layering influences plucked from all over the world. In 2006 the Jaxx are superstar DJs, touring with Robbie Williams for Christ's sake, but they've certainly earned their stripes. Ten years on, they're sharp as tacks. Freestylers and Greatest Hits merchants take note: if you don't keep reinventing your sound, your window of relevance gets slimmer and slimmer with every passing year. – Dave Rinehart

PopMatterss Tim O'Neil rated the album as his tenth Best Electronic Music of 2006 for the website, stating that It's not their best album, not compared to 1999's epochal Remedy or 2001's assured Rooty. But it is an improvement on 2003's overrated Kish Kash, which garnered so much initial attention but hasn't aged nearly as well as its predecessors. Thankfully, Crazy Itch Radio is nowhere near as hyperkinetic and jam-packed as Kish Kash. It still feels stuffed to the gills in places, but it seems as if the duo have at least acknowledged that an album like Kish Kash was so dense as to be almost unlistenable in places. There are still a few moments of confusion and chaos—why the hell did they bury the lead on "Hush Boy" but have a grimey Muppet scream the chorus?—but when the Jaxx are on, as on a track like "Take Me Back to Your House", they work better than almost any other dance act in the world today..

Promotion
In 2006, Basement Jaxx were the support acts for the European leg of Robbie Williams's Close Encounters Tour, which started on 9 June and ended on 19 September. The duo at first refused to be a part of the tour because most of Ratcliffe's friends who "are into good music don't think Robbie's very good at all". They later changed their minds after learning Williams was playing at Wembley Stadium, which Ratcliffe called "such a historical venue", and because their friends encouraged them.

Track listing

Charts

References 

Basement Jaxx albums
2006 albums
XL Recordings albums